Sandra Muller (born 31 May 1980) is a Dutch former footballer who played for the Netherlands women's national football team between 1997 and 2006.

References

Living people
1980 births
Place of birth missing (living people)
Netherlands women's international footballers
Dutch women's footballers
Women's association footballers not categorized by position